Couvade is a term which was coined by anthropologist E. B. Tylor in 1865 to refer to certain rituals in several cultures that fathers adopt during pregnancy.

Couvade can be traced to Ancient Egypt as a "sacred birth custom, of when a child is born, the man experiences the ritual of "labor" in which he takes to his bed, and undergoes periods of fasting and purification, and the observance of certain taboos".

The Ancient Greek writer Plutarch mentions a report by one Paeon the Amathusian of a custom in Cyprus honouring Ariadne's death (who had died while pregnant) in which a young man would lie down and imitate the crying and gesturing of women during labor.

The term "couvade" is borrowed from French (where it is derived from the verb couver "to brood, hatch"); the use in the modern sense derives from a misunderstanding of an earlier idiom faire la couvade, which meant "to sit doing nothing."

An example of couvade is that the Cantabri people had a custom in which the father, during or immediately after the birth of a child, took to bed, complained of having labour pains, and was accorded the treatment usually shown to women during pregnancy or after childbirth. Similarly, in Papua New Guinea, fathers built a hut outside the village and mimicked the pains of labour until the baby is born. Similar rituals occur in other cultural groups in Thailand, Russia, China, India and many indigenous groups in the Americas.

In some cultures, "sympathetic pregnancy" is attributed to efforts to ward off demons or spirits from the mother or seek favour of supernatural beings for the child. Couvade has been reported by travelers throughout history, including the Greek geographer Strabo (3.4.17).

According to Claude Lévi-Strauss, the custom of couvade reinforces the institution of the family in some societies by "welding" together men and their wives and future children.

See also
Couvade syndrome

References

External links
 
 Couvade in Tribal Cultures

Rituals
1865 introductions
Human pregnancy